Happy Holidays is a Christmas album and the seventh studio album by Billy Idol. It includes renditions of many traditional songs and two original songs, "Happy Holiday" and "Christmas Love". Music videos were released for "Jingle Bell Rock", "Happy Holiday", "White Christmas" and "Winter Wonderland".

A remixed version with new cover and different tracklist was released on November 5, 2021. It will also be issued on vinyl for the first time.

Track listing

Notes
The 2021 rerelease adds a new song, "On Christmas Day", but deletes the tracks "Merry Christmas Baby", "Blue Christmas", and "Christmas Love".

Personnel
Billy Idol – lead vocals
Brian Tichy – guitars, bass guitar, drums
Derek Sherinian – keyboards

Charts

References

Billy Idol albums
2006 Christmas albums
Christmas albums by English artists
Rock Christmas albums